Phymaphora is a genus of handsome fungus beetles in the family Endomychidae. There are at least two described species in Phymaphora.

Species
These two species belong to the genus Phymaphora:
 Phymaphora californica Horn, 1880
 Phymaphora pulchella Newman, 1838

References

Further reading

 
 
 
 

Endomychidae
Articles created by Qbugbot
Coccinelloidea genera